Bolshoy Keltey (Olo Kältäy) is a rural locality (a village) and the administrative centre of Kelteyevsky Selsoviet, Kaltasinsky District, Bashkortostan, Russia. The population was 759 as of 2010. There are 18 streets.

Geography 
Bolshoy Keltey is located 18 km west of Kaltasy (the district's administrative centre) by road. Kuterem is the nearest rural locality.

References 

Rural localities in Kaltasinsky District